Lelepa (Havannah Harbour) is a small Oceanic language of Vanuatu, spoken on Lelepa, off northwest Efate Island.

References

External links 
 ELAR archive of Description and Documentation of Lelepa
 Paradisec has a number of collections of materials on Lelepa

Central Vanuatu languages